Jennifer Gatti (born October 4, 1968, in Manhattan, New York) is an American actress who has taken on several television roles.

She is notable for her role as the first Dinah Marler on Guiding Light from 1986 to 1987, as well as for her role of HIV-positive character Keesha Monroe on the CBS soap opera The Young and the Restless from 1995 to 1996.  Also, as a teenager, she was in the music video for the song, "Runaway" by Bon Jovi.

Gatti has also guest starred in the television series Full House, Doogie Howser, M.D., Cheers, ER, Cosby, NCIS, CSI: Crime Scene Investigation, Star Trek: The Next Generation and Star Trek: Voyager. As well as appearing in the films Mobsters (1991), Nemesis (1992), Street Knight (1993), and Double Exposure (1994).

Filmography

Film

Television

Music videos 

 "Runaway" (1984) by Bon Jovi, as The Girl

References

External links
 
 
 

1968 births
20th-century American actresses
21st-century American actresses
Actresses from New York City
American child actresses
American film actresses
American soap opera actresses
American television actresses
Living people
People from Manhattan